Emile Fabry (Verviers, 1865–1966) was a Belgian artist and painter.

Fabry is an old student of Jean-François Portaels. One of his famous works are the decorative mosaics in the Cinquanteniare of Brussels. During his career he worked with Victor Horta, the decorations in the Hotel Solvay are by his hand.

He died 101 years old.

Honours 
 1932 : Commander in the Order of Leopold.

References

1865 births
1966 deaths
People from Verviers
20th-century Belgian painters